The Ministry of National Development (MND; ;) is a ministry of the Government of Singapore responsible for the formulation and implementation of policies related to the land-use planning and infrastructure development in Singapore.

History
The ministry was established after the 1959 legislative assembly elections. It was originally composed of departments previously under the Ministry of Local Government, Land and Housing, Ministry of Communications and Works, the City Council and Rural Board (Architectural and Buildings Surveyors Section), and Ministry of Commerce and Industry (Fisheries, Veterinary Services and Rural Development).

Responsibilities 
MND's key responsibilities include the planning, management and redevelopment of land resources and the development of public housing. The promotion of the construction, real estate and agrotechnology industries, as well as the management and improvement of industry standards in the real estate agent industry also come under the purview of the ministry. The MND is also tasked with the development and management of green spaces, recreational infrastructure and the conservation of nature areas. It is also the ministry in charge of food safety, animal and plant health.

Organisational structure

The MND is made up of nine divisions: Strategic Planning Division, Housing Division, Infrastructure Division, Research & Strategy Management Division, Corporate Development Division, Corporate Communications Division, the Eco-City Project Office, the Centre for Liveable Cities and the Internal Audit Unit. On 1 October 2014, the Municipal Services Office was set up under the Ministry of National Development, with the aim to improve the Government's overall coordination and delivery of municipal services.

Strategic Planning
The Strategic Planning Division works with the Urban Redevelopment Authority to help Singapore meet its land use needs with respect to the economy and living environment. It also comes up with policies relating to land use sales / planning, development control and the private property market.

Housing
The Housing Division works with the Housing Development Board to plan and develop public housing towns that provide Singaporeans with affordable homes. The division's aims include community cohesion (by providing community spaces for interaction) and policies that support social objectives, such as racial harmony (Ethnic Integration Policy) and stronger family ties (CPF Housing Grant for those who live near their parents).

The Housing Division is responsible for policies on home ownership, public rental housing for low income families and the rejuvenation of older estates, amongst others.

Infrastructure
The Infrastructure Division works with the Building and Construction Authority to shape the built environment for Singapore via building safety, construction quality, sustainability of buildings and construction, and the usability of the built environment. The Infrastructure Division also develops policies on the construction industry, sustainable development, accessibility, and building safety and quality.

The Infrastructure Division also partners the National Parks Board to integrate Singapore's urban infrastructure and garden environments. Together, they develop policies on enhancing greenery infrastructure, encouraging community participation in greening, and developing the horticultural industry. They also take care of veterinary issues too after the disbandment of Agri-Food and Veterinary Authority

Planning and Research
The Planning and Research Department undertakes policy reviews, and research and economic analyses. It also carries out international relations work by liaising with foreign counterparts to facilitate the exchange of knowledge and expanding international outreach efforts.

Eco-City Project Office
The Eco-City Project Office spearheads the Sino-Singapore Tianjin Eco-City, which seeks to address the challenges of sustainable development in a holistic and balanced manner.

Centre for Liveable Cities
The Centre for Liveable Cities (CLC) was set up in 2008 by the MND and the Ministry of the Environment and Water Resources. It is a research think tank that focuses on sustainable urban development. It seeks to understand Singapore's transformation in the last five decades, and to create and share knowledge and urban solutions for "current and future challenges relevant to Singapore and other cities".

Statutory Boards
The ministry oversees five statutory boards and three professional committees. These are:
 Building and Construction Authority (BCA)
 Council for Estate Agencies (CEA)
 Housing Development Board (HDB)
 National Parks Board (NParks)
 Urban Redevelopment Authority (URA)

Ministers
The Ministry is headed by the Minister for National Development, who is appointed as part of the Cabinet of Singapore. The incumbent minister is Desmond Lee from the People's Action Party.

References

External links 

 

National Development
Singapore
1959 establishments in Singapore
Singapore